Lischnitz may refer to the following places:

in the Czech Republic:
Lischnitz, the German name for Lišnice, a village in Most District
Lischnitz, the German name for Líšnice (Ústí nad Orlicí District), a village in Ústí nad Orlicí District
Lischnitz, the German name for Líšnice u Prahy, a village in Prague-West District

in Poland:
Lischnitz, the German name for Leśnice, a village in Lębork County
Ober Lischnitz, the German name for Dziechlino, a village in Lębork County